Vasileios Sotiriadis was a Greek politician and representative of Northern Epirus during the struggle for the establishment of the Autonomous Republic of Northern Epirus in 1914.

Sotiriadis was from Leskovik, in modern southern Albania. He was one of the two representatives of Leskovik in the Assembly of Delvino in July 1914, where the representatives of Northern Epirus were to ratify the Protocol of Corfu, that granted autonomy to the region.

Sotiriadis was later elected as member of the Greek parliament (1915-1917) for the Argyrokastro prefecture, when his homeland came under Greek control.

References

Sources

Greek MPs 1915–1917
Northern Epirus independence activists
People from Kolonjë